= Hakafashist =

Hakafashist (Armenian: Հակաֆաշիստ, 'Anti-Fascist') was an Armenian language newspaper published in Iranian Azerbaijan 1943-1945. Hakafashist was an organ of the Anti-Fascist Committee of Azerbaijan. In 1945 it changed name of Arulik (արևելք, 'East').
